Vladimir Andreevich Makogonov (August 27, 1904 – January 2, 1993) was a chess player from Azerbaijan SSR. He was born in Nakhchivan but lived in Baku for most of his life. He became an International Master in 1950 and was awarded an honorary Grandmaster title in 1987.

Makogonov never became well known outside the Soviet Union, but was highly respected in his country as a player and coach. He was one of the world's strongest players in the 1940s: Chessmetrics calculates his highest historical rating as 2735 in October 1945, and his highest historical world rank as fifth in July 1945.

Chess career
Makogonov was the five-time champion of Azerbaijan from 1947 to 1952 and played in eight USSR Championships between 1927 and 1947, his best result being fourth in 1937 and a tie for fourth place in 1939. Notable tournament results include a tie for third place at Leningrad–Moscow 1939 behind Salo Flohr and Samuel Reshevsky, and second place at Sverdlovsk 1943 behind Mikhail Botvinnik, but ahead of Vasily Smyslov and Isaac Boleslavsky. In 1942, he defeated Salo Flohr in a twelve-game match held in Baku by a score of 7½–4½. He played on Board 9 in the 1945 USSR–USA radio match, beating Abraham Kupchik 1½–½. He stopped playing competitively in the 1950s.

Makogonov was also very well known as a chess coach. He helped Smyslov prepare for his 1957 World Chess Championship match against Botvinnik. He trained Vladimir Bagirov and Genrikh Chepukaitis, and on Botvinnik's recommendation, became one of young Garry Kasparov's first teachers.

His brother, Mikhail Makogonov (1900–1943), was also a chess master; they tied for first in the first Baku chess championship in 1923.

Makogonov died on January 2, 1993, at the age of 88.

Legacy

As a player, Makogonov was noted for his positional style. He made several contributions to chess opening theory; there is a Makogonov Variation in the King's Indian Defence (1.d4 Nf6 2.c4 g6 3.Nc3 Bg7 4.e4 d6 5.h3) and in the Grünfeld Defence (1.d4 Nf6 2.c4 g6 3.Nc3 d5 4.Nf3 Bg7 5.e3 0-0 6.b4). He helped develop the Tartakower System in the Queen's Gambit Declined, which is called the Tartakower–Makogonov–Bondarevsky System or TMB System in Russian.

References

External links
 

1904 births
1993 deaths
Chess grandmasters
Chess theoreticians
Chess players from Baku
Soviet chess players
Russian chess players
Chess coaches
People from the Nakhchivan Autonomous Republic
Azerbaijani people of Russian descent
20th-century chess players